Col. Sir William Arthington Worsley, 4th Baronet (5 April 1890 – 4 December 1973), was an English landowner and amateur first-class cricketer.

Biography
Worsley was born at Hovingham Hall, Yorkshire, England, the son of Sir William Henry Arthington Worsley of Hovingham, 3rd Baronet (born 12 January 1861), and his wife, Lady Augusta Mary (née Chivers Bower; died 1913).

His paternal grandparents were Sir Arthington Worsley of Hovingham, 2nd Baronet (21 December 1830 – 3 June 1861), and Marianne Christina Isabella Hely-Hutchinson (5 May 1832 – 11 August 1893): his maternal grandparents were Edward Chivers Bower and Amelia Mary Bennett-Martin.

Worsley attended Ludgrove School and Eton College. He served as a lieutenant and subsequently captain with the Green Howards (now part of the Yorkshire Regiment) in World War I. He was wounded and taken prisoner.

Worsley was Lord Lieutenant of the North Riding of Yorkshire from 1951 to 1965.

In 1967, Worsley was awarded an honorary LLD by the University of Leeds. The degree was conferred on him by his daughter in her role as Chancellor of the university.

Marriage and children
Worsley married Joyce Morgan Brunner (6 February 1895 – 3 January 1979), daughter of Sir John Brunner, 2nd Baronet, and his wife Lucy Marianne Vaughan Morgan, on 20 May 1924 at St. Margaret's, Westminster.  They had four children:

 Sir (William) Marcus John Worsley, 5th Baronet (6 April 1925 – 18 December 2012),
 (George) Oliver Worsley (22 February 1927 – 30 November 2010),
 John Arthington Worsley (15 July 1928 – 2 March 2022),
 Katharine Lucy Mary Worsley (born 22 February 1933), married Prince Edward, Duke of Kent, thereby becoming Duchess of Kent.

Cricketer
He captained Yorkshire County Cricket Club in 1928 and 1929, his only seasons of first-class cricket. He had been unable to accept the captaincy in 1924 due to business commitments.

Worsley followed Major Arthur Lupton as captain, but only accepted the position after the Yorkshire committee had initially offered Herbert Sutcliffe the captaincy. Sutcliffe refused the offer after controversy broke out over the decision. The county lost only twice whilst Worsley was captain. He was awarded his county cap in 1928.

A right-handed batsman, he scored 722 runs at 15.69, with a highest score of 60 against Hampshire, and took 32 catches in the field. His great-uncle, George Cayley, played four games for the Marylebone Cricket Club (MCC) and Cambridge University.

He was President of Yorkshire County Cricket Club from 1960, until his death in 1973; and was President of the MCC in 1962.

References

External links
Cricinfo Profile
Cricket Archive Statistics
Wisden obituary

1890 births
1973 deaths
Baronets in the Baronetage of the United Kingdom
British Army personnel of World War I
World War I prisoners of war held by Germany
Green Howards officers
Knights of the Order of St John
Lord-Lieutenants of the North Riding of Yorkshire
People educated at Eton College
People from Hovingham
Presidents of the Marylebone Cricket Club
Presidents of Yorkshire County Cricket Club
Yorkshire cricketers
Yorkshire cricket captains
British World War I prisoners of war
English cricketers
William Worsley
People educated at Ludgrove School